The Women's 400m Individual Medley event at the 10th FINA World Aquatics Championships swam 27 July 2003 in Barcelona, Spain. Preliminary heats swam in the morning session, with the top-8 finishers advancing to swim again in the Final that evening.

At the start of the event, the World (WR) and Championship (CR) records were:
WR: 4:33.59 swum by Yana Klochkova (Ukraine) on September 16, 2000 in Sydney, Australia.
CR: 4:36.10 swum by Petra Schneider (East Germany) on August 1, 1982 in Guayaquil, Ecuador

Results

Final

Preliminaries

References

World Aquatics Championships
Swimming at the 2003 World Aquatics Championships
2003 in women's swimming